Gale Zoë Garnett (born 17 July 1942) is a New Zealand–born Canadian singer best known in the United States for her self-penned, Grammy-winning folk hit "We'll Sing in the Sunshine". Garnett has since carved out a career as an author and actress.

Biography

Garnett was born in Auckland, New Zealand, and moved to Canada with her family when she was 11. She made her public singing debut in 1960, while at the same time pursuing an acting career, making guest appearances on television shows such as 77 Sunset Strip. 

She made her New York nightclub debut in 1963 at The Blue Angel Supper Club and was signed by RCA Victor Records that same year. In the fall of 1964, Garnett scored a number four pop hit, with her original composition "We'll Sing in the Sunshine" (also No. 1 on Billboard's Adult Contemporary singles chart for seven weeks and a Top 50 country hit), and recorded her debut album, My Kind of Folk Songs, for RCA Victor. 

Riding the success of "We'll Sing in the Sunshine", which won a 1965 Grammy for Best Folk Recording, sold over one million copies thus gaining gold disc status, Garnett continued to record through the rest of the 1960s with her backing band the Gentle Reign. Her follow-up to "We'll Sing in the Sunshine", "Lovin' Place", was her only other single to chart in America. She appeared twice on ABC's Shindig! and The Lloyd Thaxton Show at the height of her singing fame in the mid 1960s.

Garnett delivered a notable performance in the Rankin-Bass feature Mad Monster Party in the late 1960s, with the memorable tunes "Our Time to Shine" and "Never Was a Love Like Mine." At this period she had begun to be more influenced by the counterculture, and had embraced psychedelic themes to some extent. In the late 1960s she recorded two albums of psychedelic-inflected music with the Gentle Reign.

In 1975, Garnett participated in an Off-Off Broadway theater production of Starfollowers in an Ancient Land, written and directed by H. M. Koutoukas, at the La MaMa Experimental Theater Club in New York City's East Village. Garnett performed in the cast, and also co-wrote the music for the production with Tom O'Horgan.

Later career
Although Garnett had retired from the music business by the 1980s, she continued occasionally appearing in feature films (including the 2002 sleeper hit My Big Fat Greek Wedding) and on television shows, usually in supporting roles. 

In subsequent years, she branched out into journalism, writing essays, columns, and book reviews for various newspapers and magazines. She also wrote and performed two one-person theater pieces, Gale Garnett & Company and Life After Latex.

Garnett also did the voice of the "Mother KOIT" liners for KOIT-FM (93.3 FM) in San Francisco in the mid to late 1960s during its progressive rock formatted era (1968–1970).

Books by Garnett
Garnett published her first novel, a romance titled Visible Amazement, in 1999. She followed with Transient Dancing (2003), the novella Room Tone (2007), and Savage Adoration, her latest release (2009).

Discography

Albums
Track listings: 
 My Kind of Folk Songs (1964)
 Track listing: I Know You Rider / Take This Hammer / Oh Brandy Leave Me Alone / Malaika / Little Man, Nine Years Old / I Came To The City / Pretty Boy / Wanderin' / Prism Song / We'll Sing In The Sunshine / Sleep You Now / Fly Bird
 1997 CD reissue additional tracks: Lovin' Place / St. James Infirmary / God Bless The Child / Excuse Me Mister / We'll Sing In The Sunshine (alternate version) 
 Lovin' Place (1965)
 Track listing: Lovin' Place / You Are My Sunshine / You've Been Talkin' 'Bout Me Baby / Where Do You Go To Go Away / Big Grey City / Nobody Knows You When You're Down And Out / What-cha Gonna Do / I Used To Live Here / The Sunny Song / St. Louis Is A Long Way Away / Little Poppa / O Freedom 
 The Many Faces of Gale Garnett (1965)
 Track listing: Won't You Be My Lover / Excuse Me Mister / As Much As I Can / Marionette / Ain't Gonna Stay In Love Alone / God Bless The Child / Settle Down / The Question Song / Long Time Blues / Forget It / I Wish You Were Here / St. James Infirmary 
 Variety Is the Spice of Gale Garnett (1965)
 Track listing: Why Am I Standing At The Window / A Little Bit Of Rain / Has Anyone Here Seen Me? / Small Potatoes / The Same Game / Carrick Fergus / The Other Side Of This Life / Love Games / I'm Gonna Be Myself By Myself / If You Go Away Again / People Come And Go / Sometime You Gotta Let Somebody Down
 Growing Pains, Growing Pleasures (1966)
 Track listing: Just Wait And See / It's Been A Lovely Summer / Little Something On The Side / Blue Prelude / Starting Anew / Put Your Hands Down / Morning Dew / Sun Must Shine / You've Got To Fall In Love Again / No Other Name / This Child / Nice Man 
 New Adventures (1966)
 Track listing: Oh There'll Be Laughter / Calm And Collected / Where Did You Go? / Angle Song / Scarlett Ribbons (For Her Hair) / That Was Me You Ran Over / So Long / Let The Lonely Go / Followin' The Rain / Back With Me / It Ain't Necessarily So 
 Gale Garnett Sings About Flying and Rainbows and Love and Other Groovy Things (1967)
 Track listing: I Make Him Fly / Don't Hurt Him / You're Gone Now / Just Wait And See / No Other Name / This Child / Over The Rainbow / Lie To Me Easy / You're Doing Me No Good / The Sun Is Gray / Look Who's Here / I Am Shining 
 An Audience with the King of Wands (1968; with The Gentle Reign)
 Track listing: Breaking Through / Fall In Love Again / Mini-Song #1: Ophelia Song / Ballad For F. Scott Fitzgerald / Big Sur / Mini-Song #2: Tropicana High / That's Not The Way / A Word Of Advice / Believe Me / Mini-Song #3: Lament For The Self-Sufficient / You Could Have Been Anyone / Bad News / Dolphins / Mini-Song #4: Tropicana Low 
 Sausalito Heliport (1969; with The Gentle Reign)
 Track listing: Freddy Mahoney / Peace Comes Slowly To The Trashing Fish / The Pretty Is Gone / This Year's Child / Berkeley Barb Want Ad / Deer In The City / Water Your Mind / My Mind's Own Morning / The Trip Note Song / Man In The Middle / Freely Speaking

Singles (partial list)
 "We'll Sing in the Sunshine" (1964) – US No. 4 Pop, No. 1 Adult Contemporary, No. 42 Country b/w "Prism Song" (RCA 8388) 
 "Lovin' Place" (1964) – US No. 54 Pop b/w "I Used To Live Here" (RCA 8472) 
 "I'll Cry Alone" (1965) b/w "Where Do You Go To Go Away" (RCA 8549) 
 "Why Am I Standing at the Window" (1965) b/w "I'm Gonna Sit Right Down And Write Myself A Letter" (RCA 8668) 
 "You've Got To Fall in Love Again" / "It's Been A Lovely Summer" (1966) (RCA 8961) 
 "This Kind Of Love" / "Oh There'll Be Laughter" (1966) (RCA 8824) 
 "I Make Him Fly" / "The Sun Is Gray" (1966) (RCA 9020)
 "Over The Rainbow" / "The Cats I Know" (1967) (RCA 9196) 
 "Malaika/Pretty Boy" (1970s) (RCA 40568)

Filmography

Movies
The Pink Panther (1963) (voice) as Princess Dala
Mad Monster Party (1967) (voice) as Francesca
Journey (1972) as Morgan, herbalist
Happy Mother's Day, Love George (1973) as Yolanda
Tribute (1980) as Hilary
The Children (1980) as Cathy Freemont
Overnight (1985) as Del
Mr. and Mrs. Bridge (1990) as Mabel Ong
Thirty Two Short Films About Glenn Gould (1993) as a Journalist
Men with Guns (1997) as Eileen Janey
My Big Fat Greek Wedding (2002) as Aunt Lexy (credited as Gale Zoë Garnett)

Television
Hong Kong as Miss Wong (1 episode, 1960)
 When Strangers Meet
Hawaiian Eye (2 episodes)
 White Pigeon Ticket (1960) as Joyce Gilbert
 The Trouble with Murder (1961) as Kiana Soong
77 Sunset Strip (2 episodes)
 The Double Death of Benny Markham (1960) as China Mary
 Flight from Escondido (1962) as Velia
The Real McCoys   (3 episodes)
 Pepino's Wedding as Maria
 Pepino's Inheritance as Angela 
 The Auction as Angela
Bonanza as Maria Winters (1 episode, 1962)
 The Deserter
Tales of Wells Fargo as Ruth (1 episode, 1962)
 Winter Storm 
The Dick Powell Show as Paca (1 episode, 1962)
 Death in a Village
Have Gun - Will Travel as Prudence Powers (1 episode, 1963)
 Debutante 
The Red Skelton Show as Guest Vocalist (1 episode, 1964)
 Episode #14.8  
Suspense (1 episode, 1964)
 I, Lloyd Benson 
The Rat Patrol as Safti (1 episode, 1967)
 The Trial by Fire Raid 
Paul Bernard, Psychiatrist (1971) as Mrs. Donaldson
Kojak as Elaine Kastos (1 episode, 1975)
 Night of the Piraeus 
King of Kensington as Carol (2 episodes, 1978)
 Carol's Arrival 
 Double Standard 
The Littlest Hobo as Madame Sybil (1 episode, 1980)
 Carnival of Fear  
Hangin' In as Renee (1 episode, 1983)
 She Shoots, He Scores 
The Edison Twins as Lana Garbo (1 episode, 1985)
 Everyone a Rembrandt 
The Park Is Mine (1986) (TV movie) as Rachel
Leona Helmsley: The Queen of Mean (1990) (TV movie) as May
Friday the 13th: The Series as Dr. Sybil Oakwood (1 episode, 1990)
 The Tree of Life  
E.N.G. as Lady Lovene (1 episode, 1992)
 Two for the Show  
Janek: The Silent Betrayal (1994) (TV movie) as Ginette
Kung Fu: The Legend Continues as Jo Emery (1 episode, 1995)
 The Return of Sing Ling  
Wild Card as Oxsana Petrovich (1 episode, 2005)
 Russian Missus Gets No Kisses (credited as Gale Zoë Garnett)

Soundtrack
Penelope (1966) (music: "The Sun Is Gray")

References

External links

1942 births
Living people
Canadian television actresses
Canadian women folk singers
Canadian folk singers
Canadian women novelists
Grammy Award winners
RCA Victor artists
New Zealand emigrants to Canada
People from Auckland
20th-century Canadian novelists
21st-century Canadian novelists
20th-century Canadian women writers
21st-century Canadian women writers